Th Methodist Episcopal Church in Idaho Springs, Colorado, also known as the Idaho Methodist Episcopal Church, or the First United Methodist Church, or the Methodist Church of Idaho, is a historic Methodist Episcopal church building at 1414 Colorado Boulevard. It was built in 1880 and expanded in 1905.  It was added to the National Register in 1998.

The church's design includes elements of Gothic Revival style.

The church's former parsonage, located to the north, has been modified and is not included in the listing.

References

Methodist churches in Colorado
Churches on the National Register of Historic Places in Colorado
Gothic Revival church buildings in Colorado
Churches completed in 1880
Buildings and structures in Clear Creek County, Colorado
National Register of Historic Places in Clear Creek County, Colorado